Robert Strauss (born October 1, 1983) is an American professional wrestler and manager. He is currently signed to WWE, where he performs on the NXT brand as a manager and occasional wrestler under the ring name Mr. Stone (previously Robert Stone). He is best known for his time in Total Nonstop Action Wrestling under the ring name Robbie E, where he is a former two-time TNA World Tag Team Champion as part of The BroMans with Jessie Godderz, while also being a former one-time TNA Television Champion and TNA X Division Champion. 

He has also competed in Northeastern and Mid-Atlantic independent promotions under the ring name Rob Eckos, including Chaotic Wrestling, the East Coast Wrestling Association, Hardway Wrestling, Jersey All Pro Wrestling, the National Wrestling Alliance, Pro-Pain Pro Wrestling and Mikey Whipwreck's New York Wrestling Connection.

Professional wrestling career

Early life and career
Strauss began watching professional wrestling at the age of 4 and was a fan of The Ultimate Warrior, Sting and Shawn Michaels. He saw his first live event at a local wrestling show in Woodbridge Township, headlined by "Iron" Mike Sharpe and later became interested in becoming a professional wrestler. When he turned 16, Strauss began training at Kevin Knight's Camp IWF in Woodland Park, New Jersey, where he practiced regular drills and exercises for four months until his debut against Chad Warwick on October 1, 2000.
For a few short years, he taught at Woodbridge High School as a physical education teacher.

Independent circuit (2001–2015)
Eckos spent his early career in the Independent Wrestling Federation (IWF), a local promotion based in Woodland Park, New Jersey, defeating Damian Adams at West Orange High School on January 21, 2001. He also participated in a 12-man battle royal later that night which included Dr. Hurtz, Marc Verow, BJ Thomas, Damian Adams, Jade Divine, HP Walker, Hadrian, Josh Daniels, Psycho Bitch, Tony Rage and Rapid Fire Maldonado.

On February 11, he lost to Kevin Knight and Damian Adams in two separate matches at an IWF show in West Peterson. He and Hadrian lost a tag team match to Roman & Kevin Knight on March 4 and faced Kasey Coresh, Damian Adams and Tony Balboa in singles matches during the next few weeks. On May 20, he defeated Hadrian via disqualification and, on June 3, he beat Tony Balboa at the West Orange Community Center. He also participated in a 12-man battle royal which included Dr. Hurtz, Damian Adams, Josh Daniels, Rapid Fire Maldonado, Tony Balboa, BPA Barry, Ryan Lockhart, Kasey Coresh, St. Patrick, Mr. Mike and Biggie Biggs. Eckos lost to Hadrian at the Brookwood Lounge Outdoor Car Show in Jackson, New Jersey, several days later.

On July 7, 2001, Eckos scored another disqualification win over Roman in Edison, New Jersey. The following night however, he lost to Roman in a match for the IWF Heavyweight Championship. On July 26, he beat Kasey Coresh and Ryan Lockhart in a three-way match and faced both in single matches during the next few weeks. On September 15, he and Josh Daniels lost to Damian Adams & Hadrian. He also lost to Josh Daniels the following night. Losing to Roman in a rematch for the IWF Heavyweight Title on October 28, 2001, he also entered a 15-man Royal Rumble whose participants included Roman, Shane O'Brien, Sir Michael, Ryan Lockhart, Biggie Biggs, Rapid Fire Maldonado, BPA Barry, Psycho B*tch, John Royal, Mr. Mike Winner, Hadrian, Josh Daniels, Damian Adams and Kevin Knight. Losing to Roman in a three-way match with Kevin Knight on November 24, he defeated Erik Andretti the following night. On December 29, 2001, Eckos and Dylan Black lost to Roman & Hadrian in a tag team match. The show was later broadcast on News 12 New Jersey. He also entered the 2-day IWF "Tournament of Champions" and defeated Shane O'Brien in the opening rounds but was eliminated by Josh Daniels in the quarterfinals on December 30, 2001.

In January 2002, Eckos was one of several independent wrestlers to star in a commercial for the 2002 Royal Rumble.

On June 29, 2002, Eckos made his debut in 3PW at A War Renewed losing to Josh Daniels at the ECW Arena in Philadelphia, Pennsylvania. On September 9, he also defeated Ryan Wing for the SSCW Lightweight Championship in Paramus, New Jersey. He would make three more appearances in 3PW later that year defeating White Lotus at A Night for the Flyboy on October 19, 2002, and facing Joey Matthews and Josh Prohibition in a 3-Way Dance at Return of the Dream on November 23. He was pinned by Matthews after a 12-minute match. At Year End Mayhem, he defeated Damian Adams in a singles match and, later on, in a tag team match with Matt Striker against Damian Adams & Josh Prohibition on December 28, 2002. The following night, he won the JCW Junior Heavyweight title from Jay Lethal in Union City, New Jersey.

On March 15, 2003, he lost to Billy Reil in a four corner ladder match with Low Rida and Abunai in Passaic, New Jersey, for the ICW Super Juniors Championship. Suffering a serious injury that same month, he was forced to vacate the JCW Junior Heavyweight Championship in Garfield, New Jersey, on March 23. He lost the SSCW Lightweight Championship to Dave Webb in a 3-Way Dance with Johnny Ova five days later in Clifton, New Jersey. On March 28, 2003, Eckos returned to defeat The Sandman for the SSCW Heavyweight Championship. The Sandman had won the vacant title that same night.

Eckos also made three appearances for Total Nonstop Action Wrestling (TNA) on their secondary Xplosion television show, losing to Josh Daniels on May 21, 2003, Norman Smiley on August 6, 2003, and to Team Canada (Eric Young and Johnny Devine) in a tag team match, where he teamed with Damian Adams, on July 4, 2004. He and Matt Striker defeated Christian York & Joey Matthews at A New Era on June 21 and Amish Roadkill at That's Incredible on August 19. Later that year, he and Billy Bax defeated Johnny and Joey Maxx for the ECWA Tag Team titles in Wilmington, Delaware, on September 6, 2003. They held the titles for over two years before eventually losing to The Heavyweights (Sean Royal & Dan Eckos) in Newark, Delaware.

Losing the SSCW Heavyweight title to Damian Adams on November 7, 2003, he also lost to The Blue Meanie at Raven's Rules on November 22. On December 27, 2003, he made his 3PW appearance for the year beating CJ O'Doyle at Su-Su-Superfly at the ECW Arena.

On January 31, 2004, Eckos faced Ken Scampi at a show for Stars & Stripes Championship Wrestling. He made his return to 3PW the next month appearing at its second anniversary show at the ECW Arena losing to Derek Wylde. On April 2, Eckos and Matt Striker faced Ken Scampi & Spyder (with Tara Charisma) at an event for the New York Wrestling Connection. The following night at the 2004 Super 8 Tournament, he and Bax defended the ECWA Tag Team titles defeating Striker & Ace Darling. At 3PW's The Future is Now on April 17, he faced his tag team partner Matt Striker fighting him to a no-contest. He also defeated Nate Mattson at Not Enough Time on May 15, 2004.

Reuniting with his partner weeks later, he and Striker lost to Slyk Wagner Brown & April Hunter at Splintered on June 19, 2004, and to Rockin' Rebel & Jack Victory the following month at No Limits. He and Striker also faced Ken Scampi & Spyder twice more during July, including a three-way match with Wayne & Tyler Payne on July 24, before leaving the NYWC. On August 21, he and Striker competed in a tag team Royal Rumble at 5-Star 4-Way to crown the first 3PW Tag Team Champions eventually won by Slyk Wagner Brown & April Hunter. The other teams included The Blue Meanie & Roadkill, Gary Wolfe & Mike Kruel and Jack Victory & Rockin' Rebel. A week later in Wayne, New Jersey, Eckos was pinned by his partner in a match billed as the "battle of the Youngbloods" at the CyberSpace Wrestling Federation's Cybercade on August 28, 2004.

Feuding with CJ O'Doyle, he traded victories with him at Till We Meet Again on October 16, 2004, and For the Gold on November 20. In December, he and Billy Bax also lost to The Solution (Havok & Papadon) in a non-title match for the ECWA Tag Team Championship at the debut show for New Millennium Wrestling. Organized by Devon Storm, the "Headlock on Hunger" show was a benefit show held at St. Mary's Parish in Rutherford, New Jersey and featured The Patriot, Simon Diamond, Rick Fuller, Ace Darling, Scotty Charisma, Danny Doring and Amish Roadkill.

On February 19, 2005, he made his last appearance for 3PW at its third anniversary show where he lost to CJ O'Doyle. He spent the next year in ECWA where he was featured in a video released by the promotion later that year. His matches included a singles match against Shawn Patrick, a 10-man battle royal and a 3-Way Dance between himself, Billy Bax and Scotty Charisma for the ECWA Heavyweight Championship.

Later that year, he appeared at the debut show of Piledriver Pro losing to Josh Daniels on September 10, 2005. On September 23, he won a 20-man battle royal to win a title show against NYWC Interstate Champion Amazing Red but was unable to defeat him later that night. He remained in NYWC for the rest of the year defeating Spyder, Plazma and Disturbed Damian Dragon in a four-way match on October 8 and, with help from Billy Bax, he pinned Mikey Whipwreck on December 17, 2005. During this time, he and Billy Bax also competed in Chaotic Wrestling where they and Brian Milonas beat John Walters, Luis Ortiz & Psycho in a 6-man tag team match.

Eckos and Bax defeated Mikey Whipwreck & Matt Hyson on February 25. he and Bax would continue making appearances for the New York Wrestling Connection as well as making appearances in the East Coast Wrestling Association and National Wrestling Superstars during the next several months. He and Bax also wrestled and lost to The Heart Throbs at a fundraiser for Children's Benefit in Toms River, New Jersey, on June 3, 2006.

In November, The Valedictorians defeated Jason Blade & Kid Mikaze and Team Supreme (Nicky Oceans & Corvis Fear). They also won a four-way match against Aden Chambers & Andrew Ryker, Kid Mikaze & Jason Blade and Shane Hagadorn & Pelle Primeau on December 5, 2006.

A participant in the 2007 Super 8 Tournament, he defeated Billy Bax in the opening round before losing to Sonjay Dutt in the semi-finals in Newark on November 10. He later lost to Billy Bax in a rematch on December 1, 2007.

On September 26, 2009, at NWA New Jersey The Dennis Coralluzzo Invitational 2009, The Powers Of Pain (The Barbarian & The Warlord) defeated The Varsity Club (Baby Hughie & Rob Eckos).

On April 24, 2010, Robbie wrestled Biggie Biggs on the first Dangerous Adrenaline Wrestling Gladiators Event in Ocean Township, New Jersey. On October 20, 2012, Robbie won the vacant GLCW Heavyweight Championship after defeated Armando Estrada and Mr. Anderson. On June 15, 2013, Robbie E defeated Aaron Sky and Kamel in a 3-way match for Championship Wrestling From Hollywood and Pro Wrestling Experience in Chicago, Illinois.

World Wrestling Entertainment (2005–2006)
Strauss made an appearance on the May 5, 2005, episode of WWE SmackDown under the ring name Rob Eckos, where he lost to Matt Morgan.
On January 2, 2006, Eckos made his second appearance for World Wrestling Entertainment, when he was attacked in a skit by Edge, who was doing a mock impersonation of Ric Flair during WWE Raw. The following day, Eckos appeared on the taping for Friday Night Smackdown where he teamed alongside Gus Harlacher and John Troske in a three-on-one handicap match against Mark Henry.

Total Nonstop Action Wrestling / Impact Wrestling (2010-2017)

The Shore (2010–2011)

On July 27, 2010, Strauss wrestled in a tryout dark match for Total Nonstop Action Wrestling, losing to Bobby Fish. On August 5, it was reported that TNA had signed Strauss to a contract. At the August 10 tapings of TNA Impact! Strauss wrestled a dark match under the ring name Robbie E with a gimmick inspired by the television show Jersey Shore, defeating Jeremy Buck, while being managed by Cookie. On the August 26 edition of Impact!, vignettes began airing to promote Strauss' upcoming debut. Prior to their televised debuts, Robbie E and Cookie made an appearance on September 24 at TNA's live event at The Arena in Philadelphia, Pennsylvania, interrupting Jeremy Borash and insulting the crowd, before Robbie was defeated in a match by Rhyno. At the following day's event in Rahway, New Jersey, Robbie and Cookie interrupted Mick Foley, before Robbie was again defeated in a match against Rhyno, with Foley serving as the special guest referee. Robbie and Cookie made their televised debuts on the October 7 live edition of Impact!, cutting a promo insulting the Florida crowd. The following Sunday at Bound for Glory Robbie attacked X Division Champion Jay Lethal after his title match with Douglas Williams, claiming he was a disgrace to New Jersey. Robbie and Cookie gained mainstream attention through the following edition of Impact!, where Cookie had a cat fight with Jersey Shore cast member Jenni "JWoww" Farley.

Robbie made his in–ring debut the following week, defeating Amazing Red, and afterwards called out X Division Champion Jay Lethal. The following week Robbie defeated Lethal in a non–title street fight, after interference from Cookie, to earn the right to challenge for the X Division Championship. On November 7 at Turning Point, Robbie defeated Lethal, with help from Cookie, to win the X Division Championship for the first time. The following month at Final Resolution Robbie retained the title in a rematch via disqualification, when Lethal was caught using Cookie's hairspray on him. During the match Cookie was suspended above the ring in a shark cage. On December 7 at the tapings of the December 16 edition of Impact!, Robbie E lost the X Division Championship back to Lethal.

On the February 10 edition of Impact!, Robbie E entered a tournament to determine a new number one contender to the X Division Championship, now held by Kazarian, and defeated Brian Kendrick and Suicide in a three-way match to advance to the finals at Against All Odds. Robbie won the finals at Against All Odds via forfeit, after both of his competitors, Jeremy and Max Buck were unable to attend the event due to travel issues. Kazarian granted Robbie his title match immediately afterwards and defeated him to retain the X Division Championship. On the following edition of Impact! Robbie complained about the rushed title match and was granted another shot at the X Division Championship, but lost via disqualification, after Cookie interfered in the match. After the match Kazarian's real life wife Traci Brooks returned to TNA and helped her husband chase Robbie and Cookie out of the ring. On the March 3 edition of Impact! Robbie and Cookie aligned themselves with former Jersey Shore cast member Angelina Pivarnick, with whom they bonded through their mutual dislike of Jenni "JWoww" Farley, whom Pivarnick proceeded to challenge to a match. On March 13 at Victory Road, Robbie E received another shot at Kazarian and the X Division Championship, this time in an Ultimate X match, which also included Jeremy and Max Buck, but was again unsuccessful in his attempt to regain the title. On the August 11 edition of Impact Wrestling, Robbie broke up with Cookie, after she inadvertently cost him his match against X Division Champion Brian Kendrick.

Teaming and feuding with Rob Terry (2011–2013)

After Cookie's departure from the promotion, Robbie began looking for a new partner and, on the August 25 edition of Impact Wrestling, Robbie E made an offer to Rob Terry. On the September 8 edition of Impact Wrestling, Terry attacked Eric Young after his match with Robbie E, signifying a new alliance between the two. After losing another match against Young on the October 27 edition of Impact Wrestling, Robbie and Terry, now dubbed "Robbie T", again attacked the Television Champion, which led to him announcing that he was going to bring another Jersey Shore cast member, Ronnie, to face the two the following week. After a confrontation, which led to Robbie and Terry attacking Young and Ronnie, on the November 3 edition of Impact Wrestling, the two teams faced each other in a tag team match the following week, where Ronnie was able to pick up the win for his team by pinning Robbie. On November 13 at Turning Point, Robbie defeated Young to win the TNA Television Championship for the first time. He would go on to defend his title against Devon and Rob Van Dam on the November 17 and December 1 editions of Impact Wrestling. On December 11 at Final Resolution, Robbie successfully defended the title against Young in a rematch. On February 12, 2012, at Against All Odds, Robbie retained his title against Shannon Moore, who answered his open challenge. On the February 23 edition of Impact Wrestling, Robbie was defeated by A.J. Styles via disqualification, following interference from Kazarian and Christopher Daniels; as a result Robbie retained his title. On March 18 at Victory Road, Robbie E lost the Television Championship to Devon after the latter answered his open challenge. During the next two months, Robbie made three unsuccessful attempts at regaining the Television Championship from Devon; first in a steel cage match on April 15 at Lockdown, then in a singles match on the May 3 episode of Impact Wrestling, and finally in a three-way match, also involving Robbie T, on May 13 at Sacrifice. Robbie E and Robbie T would continue their feud with Devon by attacking him during his title matches. On the June 7 episode of Impact Wrestling, Robbie received another shot at Devon's Television Championship, but was defeated following outside interference from Garett Bischoff. Three days later at Slammiversary, the Robbies were defeated in a tag team match by Devon and Bischoff.

On the following episode of Impact Wrestling, Robbie entered the 2012 Bound for Glory Series, taking part in the opening gauntlet match, from which he was eliminated by Samoa Joe. Robbie ended his participation in the tournament on the August 23 episode of Impact Wrestling with a win over A.J. Styles and Rob Van Dam in a three-way match, finishing eleventh out of the twelve wrestlers in the tournament.  On the October 18 episode of Impact Wrestling, Robbie unsuccessfully challenged Samoa Joe for the TNA Television Championship. Going into 2013, tension began to be teased between the Robbies, with Robbie T constantly upstaging and defying Robbie E. On the February 28 episode of Impact Wrestling, the alliance between the Robbies ended with Robbie E, who was pretending to reconcile with Robbie T, hitting him over the head with his VIP sign before being chased off. The rivalry culminated in a singles match on March 10 at Lockdown, where Robbie T emerged victorious. On the following episode of Impact Wrestling, Robbie E was again defeated by Robbie T, now using his real name Rob Terry, in a rematch to end the feud.

The BroMans (2013–2015)

Robbie started allying himself with Jessie Godderz on the May 2 episode of Impact Wrestling, where they teamed with Joey Ryan in a handicap match against Rob Terry, which the team lost after Robbie and Godderz walked out on Ryan and left him to be pinned. On the June 27 episode of Impact Wrestling, Robbie and Godderz, accompanied by Tara, confronted TNA World Tag Team Champions Gunner and James Storm and presented themselves as the BroMans. The following week, The Bro Mans were defeated by Gunner and Storm in a non-title match. On October 20, during the Bound for Glory pre-show, accompanied by "Mr. Olympia" Phil Heath, the Bro-Mans won a four-way tag team gauntlet to become the number one contenders for the TNA World Tag Team Championship later in the night, where they defeated Gunner and Storm for the titles. The BroMans made their first televised title defense on the October 31 episode of Impact Wrestling, defeating Gunner and Storm in a rematch. On the November 28 Thanksgiving edition of Impact Wrestling, The BroMans won the first ever tag team turkey bowl match defeating Dewey Barnes and Norv Fernum, in the process forcing them to wear the annual turkey suits. BroMans lost the titles against The Wolves in a house show on February 23, 2014. They regained the title by defeating The Wolves and Team 246 (Kaz Hayashi and Shuji Kondo) at the Wrestle-1 Kaisen: Outbreak show in Tokyo, Japan on March 2. On April 26, At TNA PPV Sacrifice, The Bromans lost their titles to The Wolves in a 3 vs 2 handicap match with Zema Ion as their 3rd partner Robbie E began using Boom as his own. The BroMans would next pursue a feud with Knux and his new stable 'The Menagerie' stemming from Robbie's fear of clowns, which would prevent him from competing in matches. His fear would eventually become so intense he would be written off television to overcome his fear. Robbie returned to Impact Wrestling on the July 24 edition losing to The Great Muta.

On November 1, 2014, The BroMans (Robbie E and Godderz) along with DJZ were defeated by Team 246 with Minoru Tanaka during the Wrestle-1's Keiji Mutoh 30th Anniversary show. On January 23, 2015, episode of Impact Wrestling, Robbie E competed in the Feast or Fired match, during the match Velvet Sky assisted Robbie E by grabbing a feast or fired brief case but during the brief case reveal Robbie turned this around on Sky claiming that she should open the case since she was the one who originally retrieved it. Sky opened the brief case to containing the pink slip.

Various feuds (2015–2016)
On the April 17 episode of Impact Wrestling, after losing a tag team match to the Dirty Heels, Robbie E and Godderz got into a brawl. On the June 17 episode of Impact Wrestling, Robbie E turned face for the first time in his TNA career when he saved DJZ from Godderz. On June 28, 2015, at Slammiversary, he defeated his former BroMans partner Godderz. Robbie E would go on to face Godderz again in a street fight the following edition of Impact Wrestling which he lost. On the August 12 episode of Impact Wrestling, Robbie E competed in a King of the Mountain Match for the namesake championship (formerly the Television Championship) which he lost after being incapacitated from a piledriver by participant Eric Young. After Impact went off the air, Robbie E was examined for possible neck damage. During October and November (taped in July), Robbie E participated in the TNA World Title Series. defeating Eddie Edwards in his first match. However, he then lost singles matches to Matt Hardy and Davey Richards and thus finished in third place in his group, so he did not advance to the elimination rounds. Robbie E competed in the 2016 Feast or Fired match on January 26 but was unable to retrieve a briefcase.

The BroMans reunion (2016–2017)
On the March 22, 2016, episode of Impact Wrestling, Robbie E reunited with Jessie Godderz as fan favorites to face Beer Money for the TNA World Tag Team Championship, but were unsuccessful in winning the titles. At Slammiversary, Robbie E and Jessie Godderz fought Decay for the TNA World Tag Team Championship, in a losing effort.

In October, following Bound for Glory, the team quietly disbanded when Godderz went in a feud with Aron Rex for the Impact Grand Championship, and Robbie started comical segments with Grado in an attempt to introduce him in the BroMans. On the January 19 episode of Impact Wrestling, Robbie E and Swoggle lost to Aron Rex and Rockstar Spud. On the February 9 episode of Impact Wrestling, Robbie E lost to Rex in his final match for TNA. On September 29, Strauss announced on Twitter that he had parted ways with Impact Wrestling.

Pro Wrestling Noah (2017)
On March 25, it was announced that Robbie E would be representing Impact Wrestling, alongside Bram for Pro Wrestling Noah's annual Global Tag League. In light of Bram's suspension from the tournament on April 26 due to controversial Instagram posts, Kazma Sakamoto took over for Bram for the remainder of the tournament.

Return to the independent circuit (2017–2018)
After Strauss decided to part ways with Global Force Wrestling he decided to return to the independent circuit. On April 6, 2017, Robbie E unsuccessfully challenged The Black Leopard for the IWL Heavyweight Championship in Petah Tikva, Israel at the Israeli Wrestling League's IWL XIV. At the end of 2018, Strauss retired the Robbie E character and performed under his real name.

Return to WWE (2019–present)
On March 11, 2019, it was reported that Strauss has signed with WWE and would be reporting to the Performance Center. On March 21, he debuted at a NXT house show under his real name as a villainous manager, managing Rinku Singh and Saurav Gurjar. Shortly after his stable of clients grew to include Riddick Moss. He started appearing at house shows as the manager of The Outliers, a tag team consisting of Riddick Moss and Dan Matha. After 14 years not appearing on television since his SmackDown match in 2006, he made his re-debut as Robert Stone on the January 8, 2020, episode of NXT, introducing Chelsea Green as his new client of his own stable the Robert Stone Brand. On the May 27, 2020, episode of NXT, after Chelsea Green and Charlotte Flair defeated Rhea Ripley and Io Shirai, Green fired Stone. Over the next few weeks, Stone would appear on NXT with tattered clothes and unkempt hair after being fired by Green as he tried to recruit Rhea Ripley as his new client to no avail. On the June 17 episode of NXT, Stone would officially recruit Aliyah after he helped her defeat Xia Li. Stone and Aliyah would feud with Ripley as Ripley defeated Aliyah on the June 24 episode of NXT. The following week on Night 1 of NXT: The Great American Bash, Stone competed in his debut match alongside Aliyah against Ripley in a handicap match, with the stipulation that if Ripley lost then she would join the Robert Stone Brand, but they were defeated. On the July 22 episode of NXT, Stone officially recruited Mercedes Martinez into the Robert Stone Brand after she attacked Shotzi Blackheart. Martinez would later join Retribution stable and returned to NXT a year later. His name has since been changed to Mr. Stone and is currently the manager of Von Wagner alongside Sofia Cromwell until July 22, 2022, when Cromwell made her main roster debut as Max Dupri's storyline sister, Maxxine Dupri, thus making her a member of the SmackDown roster as a part of the Maximum Male Models stable.

Other media
On November 10, 2012, Strauss, along with several other TNA workers, was featured in an episode of MTV's Made.

In 2014, Strauss and former TNA Knockout Brooke Adams participated in the 25th season of The Amazing Race. They survived until the middle part of the final leg of the race, where they were the eighth team to be eliminated and placed fourth.

Strauss participated in The Titan Games: Trials 2 (Season 1, Episode 3), that aired on January 10.  He was defeated, in the first round by Bridger Buckley, in the event: Hammering Ram.

Personal life
In 2011, Strauss married his longtime girlfriend Tara Sue Gally, but they got divorced in 2013. He later reconciled with Gally and the couple remarried in 2015. Together, they have twin sons, Carter Stone and Cash Steven (born 2016).

Filmography

Championships and accomplishments

Bigger Better Wrestling Federation
BBWF Tag Team Championship (1 time) – with Dan Ramm
Chaotic Wrestling
Chaotic Wrestling Tag Team Championship (1 time) – with Billy Bax
CyberSpace Wrestling Federation
CSWF Cruiserweight Championship (1 time)
D2W Pro Wrestling
D2W Heavyweight Championship (1 time)
DDT Pro-Wrestling
Ironman Heavymetalweight Championship (1 time)
The Dynasty
Dynasty Heavyweight Championship (1 time)
East Coast Wrestling Association
ECWA Mid Atlantic Championship (1 time)
ECWA Tag Team Championship (2 times) – with Billy Bax
ECWA Hall of Fame (Class of 2006)
Great Lakes Championship Wrestling
GLCW Heavyweight Championship (1 time)
Grim Toy Show Wrestling 
 GTS YouTube Wrestling Figures Heavyweight Championship (3 times)
 GTS Tag Team Championship (1 time) - with Grim
 GTS United States Championship (1 time)
 GTS Hall of Fame 2020 Inductee
 Christmas Chaos Winner (2016)
Hardway Wrestling
HW Lightweight Championship (1 time)
Independent Superstars of Professional Wrestling
ISPW Tri state Championship (1 time) 
Jersey Championship Wrestling
JCW Cruiserweight Championship (1 time)
New York Wrestling Connection
NYWC Tag Team Championship (1 time) – with Matt Striker
NYWC Interstate Championship (1 time)
Northeast Wrestling
NEW Tag Team Championship (1 time) - with Cam Zagami
Pro Wrestling Illustrated
Ranked No. 66 of the 500 best singles wrestlers of the PWI 500 in 2012
Pro Wrestling Pride
PWP Tag Team Championship (1 time) - with Danny Walsh
Stars and Stripes Championship Wrestling
SSCW Heavyweight Championship (1 time)
SSCW Lightweight Championship (1 time)
Total Nonstop Action Wrestling
TNA Television Championship (1 time)
TNA X Division Championship (1 time)
TNA World Tag Team Championship (2 times) – with Jessie Godderz
TNA Turkey Bowl (2013) – with Jessie Godderz
TNA Turkey Bowl (2016)
TNA X Division Championship #1 Contender Tournament (2011)
TNA World Cup (2016) – with Jeff Hardy, Eddie Edwards, Jessie Godderz and Jade
UWC United States Championship (1 time)
Universal Independent Wrestling
UIW Heavyweight Championship (1 time)

References

External links

Wrestle-1 profile 

1983 births
21st-century professional wrestlers
American male professional wrestlers
Living people
Participants in American reality television series
People from Alpine, New Jersey
People from Edison, New Jersey
People from Seaside Heights, New Jersey
People from Woodbridge Township, New Jersey
Professional wrestlers from New Jersey
Sportspeople from Middlesex County, New Jersey
The Amazing Race (American TV series) contestants
TNA Legends/Global/Television/King of the Mountain Champions
TNA/Impact World Tag Team Champions
TNA/Impact X Division Champions
Ironman Heavymetalweight Champions